Anas Al-Zboun is a retired Jordanian footballer.

Honors and Participation in International Tournaments

In AFC Asian Cups 
2004 Asian Cup

In Arab Nations Cup 
2002 Arab Nations Cup

In WAFF Championships 
2002 WAFF Championship 
2004 WAFF Championship

International goals

References

External links

  

1979 births
Living people
Jordanian footballers
People from Irbid
Association football forwards
Al-Hussein SC (Irbid) players
Al-Arabi (Jordan) players
Al-Jalil players
Al-Sheikh Hussein FC players
Jordan international footballers
2004 AFC Asian Cup players